Mendrisio San Martino railway station is a railway station in the municipality of Mendrisio, in the Swiss canton of Ticino. It is an intermediate stop on the standard gauge Gotthard line of Swiss Federal Railways.

Services 
 the following services stop at Mendrisio San Martino:

References

External links 
 
 

Railway stations in Ticino
Swiss Federal Railways stations
Railway stations in Switzerland opened in 2013